Colquhounia elegans is a shrub species in the genus Colquhounia found in Asia (Yunnan, Cambodia, Laos, Myanmar, Thailand, Vietnam).

Varieties
Colquhounia elegans var. elegans - Yunnan, Cambodia, Laos, Myanmar, Thailand, Vietnam
Colquhounia elegans var. tenuiflora (Hook.f.) Prain - Yunnan, Cambodia, Laos, Myanmar, Thailand, Vietnam

References

 Kurz Forest Fl. Burma 2: 278 1877

External links
Flora of China: Colquhounia

Lamiaceae
Plants described in 1830
Flora of Asia